The Nigeria national U-17 football team known as the Golden Eaglets, is the youngest team that represents Nigeria in football  The team is the most successful in international football for their age group winning a record, five FIFA U-17 World Cup titles and are runners up on three occasions. They are also two-time Africa U-17 Cup of Nations champions with their most recent title at the 2007 edition.

History
The team won the maiden edition of FIFA U-17 World Cup in 1985 hosted by China, 1993, 2007, 2013, and 2015 (becoming only the second team since Brazil to win it back to back); making them the first team ever to win the junior world cup five times. They also won the African Under-17 Championship in 2001 and 2007, and were runners-up in 1995 and 2013.

After the 2007 victory there was some discussion as to whether the success should be rewarded in the form of cash, or if longer-term investments were more suitable for teenage players. It was pointed out that some previous players had found themselves reduced to poverty due to injury or mismanagement of their funds.

Heading into the 2009 FIFA U-17 World Cup, head coach Henry Nwosu was replaced by John Obuh, coach of Kwara United.

Although Nigeria failed to qualify for the 2011 FIFA U-17 World Cup, they participated again in the 2013 edition of the tournament. Planning was thrown into disarray however in August when key members of the team was determined by MRI scanning to be overage and excluded from the team. In their first match, the team defeated the defending champions Mexico with a 6–1 score. They only failed to defeat Sweden in the group stage, but they did so in the semi-finals. In the final match they faced and defeated Mexico for a second time, obtaining their fourth U-17 World Cup and becoming the national team to win the most U-17 tournaments so far.

The team were again the subject of age cheating accusations when, a total of 26 players from the 60-strong squad were sent home from their training camp in 2016 after failing compulsory MRI scans used to test age ahead of an African Cup of Nations qualifier. It is important to note that amidst all the age cheating accusations, the team has never been found guilty of fielding overage players in any competition. All the players accused of being overage were all caught at the Abuja training camp and sent home before they played any game for the team.

Competitive record

FIFA U-17 World Cup record

Africa U-17 Cup of Nations record 

A gold background colour indicates that Nigeria won the tournament.

*Draws include knockout matches decided on penalty kicks.

Team honours and achievements
Intercontinental
FIFA U-17 World Cup
Winners: 1985, 1993, 2007, 2013, 2015
Runners-up: 1987, 2001, 2009

Continental
 Africa U-17 Cup of Nations
Winners: 2001, 2007
Runners-up: 1995, 2013
Third-place: 2003

Others
UEFA–CAF Meridian Cup
Winners: 1997

Staff

Management
 Team Coordinator: Suleiman Abubakar
 Secretary: Egbaiyelo Tayo
 Media Coordinator: Morakinyo Abodunrin

Sports
 Head coach: Nduka Ugbade
 Assistant coach: 
 Assistant coach: 
 Scout:
 Goalkeeper coach:

Medical
 Doctor: Olarinoye Ayodeji
 Physiotherapist: Oyegunna Gabriel
 Equipment Manager: Mohammed Kafa Usman

Squad
Nigeria callups for the 2023 Africa U-17 Cup of Nations qualification

Notable former players

See also
Super Eagles (Nigeria national football team)
Flying Eagles (Nigeria national under-20 football team)
African U-17 Championship

References

External links
Official website of the Nigerian Football Federation

Under-17
African national under-17 association football teams